Arthur Richard Albiston (born 14 July 1957) is a Scottish former football player. Albiston played for Manchester United for most of his career, making almost 500 appearances for the club. He also made 14 international appearances for Scotland and was selected for their 1986 FIFA World Cup squad.

Career
Albiston joined Manchester United as an apprentice in July 1972, turning professional in July 1974. He made his debut in a League Cup Third Round match against local rivals Manchester City in 1974. He made 485 appearances in 14 years, playing at left back, and scored six goals. He helped the club win the FA Cup in 1977, 1983 and 1985.

Albiston left Manchester United in August 1988 for West Bromwich Albion, managed by ex-Red Devils boss Ron Atkinson, on a free transfer. By the time of his departure from Old Trafford he was the longest-serving player at the squad and the only player remaining from the Tommy Docherty era.

He made his Albion debut in a league match away at Leicester City early in the 1988–89 season, and went on to make 47 appearances and score two goals that season, after which he returned to his homeland to sign for Dundee, and went on to play for Chesterfield, Chester City, Molde in Norway and Ayr United. He retired from senior football in 1994.

In his professional career, he made 464 appearances and scored seven goals. He also later joined non-League sides Sittingbourne, Witton Albion and Droylsden.

Albiston also earned 14 caps for Scotland, making his debut on 28 April 1982 against Northern Ireland. His total includes one game at the 1986 FIFA World Cup, a 0–0 draw against Uruguay on 13 June 1986.

Following his retirement from playing, Albiston managed Droylsden (1996–97), was a junior coach at Manchester United (2000–04) and has also worked as a radio summariser for Manchester Independent. He currently works for MUTV, Manchester United's official television channel, acting as match summariser during live coverage of the club's reserve and academy teams.

Honours

As a player
Manchester United
Second Division
Winner (1): 1974–75
FA Cup
Winner (3): 1977, 1983, 1985
FA Charity Shield
Winner (2): 1977*, 1983 (*=shared)

References

External links

1957 births
Living people
1986 FIFA World Cup players
Scottish expatriate sportspeople in Norway
Chesterfield F.C. players
Chester City F.C. players
Droylsden F.C. players
Dundee F.C. players
Expatriate footballers in Norway
Manchester United F.C. players
Molde FK players
Eliteserien players
Footballers from Edinburgh
Scotland international footballers
Scottish expatriate footballers
Scottish football managers
Scottish footballers
English Football League players
West Bromwich Albion F.C. players
Witton Albion F.C. players
Sittingbourne F.C. players
Scotland under-21 international footballers
Ayr United F.C. players
People educated at Forrester High School
Droylsden F.C. managers
Association football fullbacks
FA Cup Final players